Part of the AFI 100 Years... series, AFI's 100 Years of Film Scores is a list of the top 25 film scores in American cinema. The list was unveiled by the American Film Institute in 2005.

John Williams has the most scores in the top 25, with three: E.T. the Extra-Terrestrial, Jaws, and the top choice, Star Wars. Elmer Bernstein, Jerry Goldsmith, Bernard Herrmann, and Max Steiner each have two scores listed.

External links
American Film Institute's 100 Years of Film Scores (winners)
The list of the 250 nominated film scores
The list of the 25 winning film scores (PDF)

AFI 100 Years... series
Film scores
Centennial anniversaries